Burgh Hill Farm Meadow is a  biological Site of Special Scientific Interest west of Hailsham in East Sussex.

This meadow is managed to encourage wildlife and 67 species of flowering plants have been recorded, such as yellow rattle, pepper saxifrage and green winged orchid. The site also has a ditch, two small ponds and mature hedgerows.

The site is private land with no public access.

References

Sites of Special Scientific Interest in East Sussex
Chiddingly